Edenton Station, United States Fish and Fisheries Commission, formerly known as Edenton National Fish Hatchery, is a historic fish hatchery and national historic district located at Edenton, Chowan County, North Carolina. The district encompasses 17 contributing buildings, 2 contributing sites, 17 contributing structures, and 2 contributing objects.  It was established in 1899 by the United States Fish and Fisheries Commission and operated by the federal government until 1954, then sold to private owners in 1961. The hatchery was operated by the Bureau of Fisheries. During the 1930s, the Public Works Administration and Works Progress Administration funded a number of building projects at the hatchery.  Notable contributing resources include the Superintendent's House (1900), Fish Culturist's House (1938-1939), terrace (1899-1900), Pump House No. 1 (1900, 1939), Pump House No. 2 (1924, 1939), Water Tank (1929), 10 Fish Ponds, Flag Pole (1922-1923), and Daphnia Pools (1939-1940).

It was listed on the National Register of Historic Places in 2002.

References

United States Fish and Wildlife Service
National Fish Hatcheries of the United States
Public Works Administration in North Carolina
Works Progress Administration in North Carolina
Agricultural buildings and structures on the National Register of Historic Places in North Carolina
Historic districts on the National Register of Historic Places in North Carolina
1899 establishments in North Carolina
Colonial Revival architecture in North Carolina
Buildings and structures in Chowan County, North Carolina
National Register of Historic Places in Chowan County, North Carolina
Agricultural buildings and structures in North Carolina